The Lersøen - Østerport line is a single-track railway line between the former Lersøen freight station and Østerport station in the Danish capital Copenhagen. The line was constructed as a freight link between the Hellerup - Vigerslev line, originally opened as a freight line, and the Copenhagen - Helsingør line.

See also 

 List of Railway Lines in Denmark

Railway lines in Denmark